Linda Olofsson may refer to:

Linda Olofsson (TV journalist) (born 1973), Swedish TV journalist
Linda Olofsson (swimmer) (born 1972), Swedish Olympic freestyle swimmer